Autumn in New York may refer to:

 "Autumn in New York" (song), a jazz standard composed by Vernon Duke in 1934
 Autumn in New York (film), a 2000 romance-drama directed by Joan Chen and starring Richard Gere
 Autumn in New York (Kenny Barron album), 1986
 Autumn in New York (Tal Farlow album), 1954
 Autumn in New York (Charles Lloyd album), 1979
 Autumn in New York (Jo Stafford album), 1950